TCG (short for "The Cheetah Girls") is the second and final studio album by The Cheetah Girls. The album was released on Hollywood Records on September 25, 2007. The album debuted at number 44 on the Billboard 200 albums chart with 19,000 copies sold in its first week. It has sold 126,000 copies to date.

Critics gave the album mixed to positive reviews, who while complimenting the girls' vocal performances, felt the album was "safe" and didn't push any boundaries. It was supplemented by the single "Fuego".

Background
The girls originally began working on the album in January 2006. However, when production began for The Cheetah Girls 2 and its accompanying soundtrack, the album was put on hold at the time. Much of the album was recorded during The Party's Just Begun Tour which began in September and ended in March 2007.

Group member Adrienne Bailon was quoted as saying: "We'll be making a real studio album, not a soundtrack. It's important for people to see us as a real musical group. We have all this great marketing around us, with the movies and other things. But we are a musical group". She also added that the soundtracks and Christmas album "don't count".

Group member Sabrina Bryan was interviewed by Billboard magazine and said that the group was eager to showcase a more mature sound to gather an audience of older fans while keeping the lyrics clean for the younger fanbase as well. She also said that the group would work with some of the producers that they had previously worked with, while also exploring new producers as well. They also announced that they'd be releasing the album via Hollywood Records rather than Walt Disney Records, which was the record labels used to release the group's soundtrack albums, their holiday album Cheetah-licious Christmas, and their live album In Concert: The Party's Just Begun Tour.

Group member Kiely Williams, describing the album, stated that "it's like the first look at the Cheetah Girls apart from our roles in the show. ... Just Sabrina, Adrienne and Kiely kind of saying what we feel ... We actually co-produced and wrote a good portion of the album". She also confirmed that this album will be "a little bit more mature than what the fans are used to". She also described the music on the album as a blend of hip-hop and R&B. The famous classical piece "Ode to Joy" was also used in the motif of the track titled "Human", which was co-written and co-arranged by award-winning vocalist Jade Valerie Villalon from Sweetbox.

In an interview with Radio Disney about the album, the group commented that some leftover tracks would be used on the One World soundtrack.

Singles 
"Fuego" was released as lead single on September 15, 2007. On their official MySpace profile, the girls described the song as a "party anthem" with "Latin influences" and a sample of Lionel Richie's '80s hit single "All Night Long (All Night)". It peaked at #27 on Billboards Hot Dance Club Play chart.

"So Bring It On" was released a Radio Disney-only promotional single on August 25, 2007. The Sony was theme of Twitches Too.

 Critical reception 
 
Marisa Brown of Allmusic gave the album three out of five stars: "Despite her appearance in the 2006 film Cheetah Girls 2, Raven-Symoné is nowhere to be found on the group's third studio album, TCG (nor was she on their live CD/DVD, In Concert: The Party's Just Begun Tour, released earlier in 2007), which is actually their first actual record, the first two being soundtracks to the accompanying Cheetah Girls films. That being said, the trio doesn't seem to have too much of a problem continuing its brand of super-produced, hook-driven suburban pop that's been thrilling Disney Channel viewers since 2003, and there's not much to distinguish TCG from any of the Girls' other releases. Which shouldn't bother fans too much, anyway, as most are probably looking for this same kind of strong, catchy radio-friendly music in the first place. TCG doesn't push any boundaries, but that's not what it's trying to do, anyway, which means that fans of theirs should be pleased with the results".

Kathi Kamen Goldmark of Common Sense Media also gave the album three out of five stars, though gave a more mixed review. She wrote: "Though parents may be grateful for any CD that isn't filled with sexist posturing, and first graders will enjoy the clearly audible lyrics and danceable beats (Spanish-infused "Fuego"), there's a manufactured quality throughout that prevents three young women with obvious talent from strutting any real stuff. In other words, the Cheetah Girls get down on TCG, but not that far".

Track listing

Wal-Mart bonus EP

Wal-Mart had a limited time exclusive-edition with a bonus disc of five songs, two of which are Spanish versions of songs that appear on the regular album.

 Personnel 
All vocals by The Cheetah Girls' (Adrienne Bailon, Sabrina Bryan, Kiely Williams)

Additional musicians
 Guitar – Bob Horn, Kevin Kadish, Paul Palmer, and Tim Pierce
 Keyboards – Ron "Neff U" Feemster
 Bass – Ron "Neff U" Feemster

Production
 Executive producer: Jon Lind, Mio Vukovic, Melissa Wiechmann, Tse Williams
 Producers: Antonina Armato, Matthew Gerrard, Leah Haywood, Daniel James, Tim James, Steve Lunt, David Norland, RedOne, Jonathan "J.R." Rotem, Soul Nana & Toka
 Vocal producer: Bishop "Young Don" Dixon, Courtney Harrell, Leah Haywood, Daniel James and Claude Kelly
 Mastering: Chris Gehringer
 Engineers: William Durst, Bob Horn, Nigel Lundemo, John D. Norten, Greg Ogan, RedOne
 Vocal engineer: Phil Margaziotis
 A&R: Jon Lind, Mio Vukovic
 Photography: Brian Bowen Smith
 Art direction & design: Jolie Clemens, Emily Frye

Charts

Release history

References

2007 albums
Albums produced by J. R. Rotem
Albums produced by Matthew Gerrard
Albums produced by RedOne
The Cheetah Girls albums
Hollywood Records albums